John Lorenzo Griffith (August 20, 1877 – December 7, 1944) was an American football, basketball, and baseball player, track athlete, coach, and college athletics administrator.  He served as the first commissioner of the Big Ten Conference from 1922 until his death in 1944.

He married Allice Kelley on 17 Aug 1904. Alice was born 8 Nov 1879 in Waterford WI to Frances Beardsley Kelley and John Lawrence Kelley. She graduated Beloit College in Beloit, WI in 1901, and taught school. Alice died 20 Dec 1961 and is buried beside her husband in Oakhill Cemetery, Mount Carroll, Carroll County, Illinois. They had one child, John Lawrence Grffith, who was born in 1916 and died in 1984. He married Katherine Johnson who was born in 1917 and died in 2001. They both are interred in the Church of the Holy Comforter Columbarium in Winnetka IL.

Coaching career

Morningside
Griffith was the head football coach at Morningside College in Sioux City, Iowa for three seasons, from 1905 until 1907.  His coaching record at Morningside was 13–6–4.

Drake
Griffith was the tenth head football coach at  Drake University in Des Moines, Iowa, serving for eight seasons, from 1908 until 1915, compiling a record of 36–25–3.  During his time at Drake, he created the Drake Relays, in 1910.

Head coaching record

Football

References

External links
 

1877 births
1944 deaths
American men's basketball players
Big Ten Conference commissioners
Beloit Buccaneers baseball players
Beloit Buccaneers football players
Beloit Buccaneers men's basketball players
Drake Bulldogs athletic directors
Drake Bulldogs football coaches
Drake Bulldogs men's basketball coaches
Morningside Mustangs football coaches
Yankton Greyhounds athletic directors
Yankton Greyhounds football coaches
University of Illinois Urbana-Champaign faculty
College men's track and field athletes in the United States
College track and field coaches in the United States
People from Mount Carroll, Illinois
Coaches of American football from Illinois
Players of American football from Illinois
Baseball coaches from Illinois
Basketball coaches from Illinois
Basketball players from Illinois